The following list of school districts in New Jersey distinguishes between regional,  consolidated and countywide districts and those serving single municipalities. Non-operating school districts, which are those districts that never operated any school facilities and where all students have attended school in other districts as part of sending/receiving relationships, are not listed. Districts are grouped by county.

Atlantic County 
Absecon Public School District
Atlantic City School District
Atlantic County Special Services School District
Atlantic County Vocational School District
Brigantine Public Schools
Buena Regional School District – Regional
Egg Harbor City School District
Egg Harbor Township Schools
Estell Manor School District
Folsom Borough School District
Galloway Township Public Schools
Greater Egg Harbor Regional High School District – Regional
Hamilton Township Schools
Hammonton Public Schools
Linwood Public Schools
Mainland Regional High School – Regional
Margate City Schools
Mullica Township Schools
Northfield Community Schools
Pleasantville Public Schools
Port Republic School District
Somers Point Public Schools
Ventnor City School District
Weymouth Township School District

Bergen County 
Allendale School District (K–8)
Alpine Public School District (K–8)
Bergen County Special Services School District – County special education for ages 3–21
Bergen County Technical Schools – County (9–12)
Bergenfield Public School District (K–12)
Bogota Public Schools (K–12)
Carlstadt Public Schools (K–8)
Carlstadt-East Rutherford Regional School District – Regional (9–12)
Cliffside Park School District (K–12)
Closter Public Schools (K–8)
Cresskill Public Schools (K–12)
Demarest Public Schools (K–8)
Dumont Public Schools (K–12)
East Rutherford School District (K–8)
Edgewater Public Schools (K–12)
Elmwood Park Public Schools (K–12)
Emerson School District (K–12)
Englewood Public School District (K–12)
Englewood Cliffs Public Schools (K–8)
Fair Lawn Public Schools (K–12)
Fairview Public Schools (K–8)
Fort Lee School District (K–12)
Franklin Lakes Public Schools (K–8)
Garfield Public Schools (K–12)
Glen Rock Public Schools (K–12)
Hackensack Public Schools (K–12)
Harrington Park School District (K–8)
Hasbrouck Heights School District (K–12)
Haworth Public Schools (K–8)
Hillsdale Public Schools (K–8)
Ho-Ho-Kus School District (K–8)
Leonia Public Schools (K–12)
Little Ferry Public Schools (K–8)
Lodi Public Schools (K–12)
Lyndhurst School District (K–12)
Mahwah Township Public Schools (K–12)
Maywood Public Schools (K–8)
Midland Park School District (K–12)
Montvale Public Schools (K–8)
Moonachie School District (K–8)
New Milford School District (K–12)
North Arlington School District (K–12)
Northern Highlands Regional High School – Regional (9–12)
Northern Valley Regional High School District – Regional (9–12)
Northvale Public Schools (K–8)
Norwood Public School District (K–8)
Oakland Public Schools (K–8)
Old Tappan Public Schools (K–8)
Oradell Public School District (K–6)
Palisades Park Public School District (K–12)
Paramus Public Schools (K–12)
Park Ridge Public Schools (K–12)
Pascack Valley Regional High School District – Regional (9–12)
Ramapo Indian Hills Regional High School District – Regional (9–12)
Ramsey Public School District (K–12)
Ridgefield School District (K–12)
Ridgefield Park Public Schools (K–12)
Ridgewood Public Schools (K–12)
River Dell Regional School District – Regional (7–12)
River Edge Elementary School District (K–6)
River Vale Public Schools (K–8)
Rochelle Park School District (K–8)
Rutherford School District (K–12)
Saddle Brook Public Schools (K–12)
Saddle River School District (K–5)
South Bergen Jointure Commission – Regional special education for ages 3–21
South Hackensack School District (K–8)
Teaneck Public Schools (K–12)
Tenafly Public Schools (K–12)
Upper Saddle River School District (K–8)
Waldwick Public School District (K–12)
Wallington Public Schools (K–12)
Westwood Regional School District – Regional (K–12)
Wood-Ridge School District (K–12)
Woodcliff Lake Public Schools (K–8)
Wyckoff School District (K–8)

Burlington County 
Bass River Township School District
Beverly City Schools
Bordentown Regional School District – Regional
Burlington County Institute of Technology
Burlington County Special Services School District – County special education for ages 3–21
Burlington Township School District
Chesterfield School District
Cinnaminson Township Public Schools
City of Burlington Public School District
Delanco Township School District
Delran Township School District
Eastampton Township School District
Edgewater Park School District
Evesham Township School District
Florence Township School District
Hainesport Township School District
Lenape Regional High School District – Regional
Lumberton Township School District
Mansfield Public Schools
Maple Shade School District
Medford Lakes School District
Medford Township Public Schools
Moorestown Township Public Schools
Mount Holly Township Public Schools
Mount Laurel Schools
New Hanover Township School District – Consolidated
North Hanover Township School District
Northern Burlington County Regional School District – Regional
Palmyra Public Schools
Pemberton Township School District
Rancocas Valley Regional High School – Regional
Riverside School District
Riverton School District
Shamong Township School District
Southampton Township Schools
Springfield Township School District
Tabernacle School District
Washington Township School District
Westampton Township Schools
Willingboro Public Schools
Woodland Township School District

The U.S. Census Bureau lists "Joint Base McGuire-Dix-Lakehurst" in Burlington County as having its own school district. Students attend area school district public schools, as the Department of Defense Education Activity (DoDEA) does not operate any schools on that base. Students on McGuire and Dix may attend one of the following in their respective grade levels, with all siblings in a family taking the same choice: North Hanover Township School District (PK-6), Northern Burlington County Regional School District (7-12), and Pemberton Township School District (K-12).

Camden County 
Audubon School District
Barrington Public Schools
Bellmawr School District
Berlin Borough School District
Berlin Township Public Schools
Black Horse Pike Regional School District – Regional
Brooklawn Public School District
Camden City School District
Camden County Technical Schools
Cherry Hill Public Schools
Chesilhurst Borough School District
Clementon School District
Collingswood Public Schools
Eastern Camden County Regional High School District – Regional
Gibbsboro School District
Gloucester City Public Schools
Gloucester Township Public Schools
Haddon Heights School District
Haddon Township School District
Haddonfield Public Schools
Laurel Springs School District
Lawnside School District
Lindenwold Public Schools
Lower Camden County Regional School District (dissolved in 2001)
Magnolia School District
Merchantville School District
Mount Ephraim Public Schools
Oaklyn Public School District
Pennsauken Public Schools
Pine Hill Schools
Runnemede Public School District
Somerdale School District
Sterling High School – Regional
Stratford School District
Voorhees Township Public Schools
Waterford Township School District
Winslow Township School District
Woodlynne School District

Cape May County 
Avalon School District
Cape May City School District
Cape May County Special Services School District
Cape May County Technical School District
Cape May Point School District (non-operating since 1931)
Dennis Township Public Schools
Lower Cape May Regional School District – Regional
Lower Township School District
Middle Township Public Schools
North Wildwood School District
Ocean City School District
Sea Isle City School District (non-operating since 2012)
Stone Harbor School District
Upper Township School District
West Cape May School District
West Wildwood School District (non-operating)
Wildwood Public School District
Wildwood Crest School District
Woodbine School District

Cumberland County 
Bridgeton Public Schools
Commercial Township School District
Cumberland County Vocational School District
Cumberland Regional High School – Regional
Deerfield Township School District
Downe Township School District
Fairfield Township School District
Greenwich Township School District
Hopewell Township School District
Maurice River Township School District
Millville Public Schools
Salem County Special Services School District
Stow Creek School District
Upper Deerfield Township Schools
Vineland Public Schools

Essex County 
Belleville School District
Bloomfield Public Schools
Caldwell-West Caldwell Public Schools – Consolidated
Cedar Grove Schools
East Orange School District
Essex County Vocational Technical Schools
Essex Fells School District
Fairfield School District
Glen Ridge Public Schools
Irvington Public Schools
Livingston Public Schools
Millburn Township Public Schools
Montclair Public Schools
Newark Public Schools
North Caldwell Public Schools
Nutley Public Schools
Orange Board of Education
Roseland School District
South Orange-Maplewood School District – Consolidated
Verona Public Schools
West Essex Regional School District – Regional
West Orange Public Schools

Gloucester County 
Clayton Public Schools
Clearview Regional High School District – Regional
Delsea Regional School District – Regional
Deptford Township Schools
East Greenwich Township School District
Elk Township School District
Franklin Township Public Schools
Gateway Regional School District – Regional
Glassboro Public Schools
Gloucester County Special Services School District
Gloucester County Vocational-Technical School District
Greenwich Township School District
Harrison Township School District
Kingsway Regional School District – Regional
Logan Township School District
Mantua Township School District
Monroe Township Public Schools
National Park School District
Paulsboro Public Schools
Pitman School District
South Harrison Township School District
Swedesboro-Woolwich School District – Consolidated
Washington Township Public School District
Wenonah School District
West Deptford Public Schools
Westville School District
Woodbury Public Schools
Woodbury Heights School District

Hudson County 
Bayonne School District (K–12)
East Newark School District (K–8)
Guttenberg Public School District (K–8)
Harrison Public Schools (K–12)
Hoboken Public Schools (K–12)
Hudson County Schools of Technology (9–12)
Jersey City Public Schools (K–12)
Kearny School District (K–12)
North Bergen School District (K–12)
Secaucus Public Schools (K–12)
Union City School District (New Jersey) (K–12)
Weehawken School District (K–12)
West New York School District (K–12)

Hunterdon County 
Alexandria Township School District K–8
Bethlehem Township School District K–8
Bloomsbury School District K–8
Califon School District K–8
Clinton-Glen Gardner School District K–8 (renamed from Clinton Public School as of 2009)
Clinton Township School District K–8
Delaware Township School District K–8
Delaware Valley Regional High School 9–12 Regional
East Amwell Township School District K–8
Flemington-Raritan Regional School District K–8 Regional
Franklin Township School District (Hunterdon County, New Jersey) K–8
Frenchtown School District K–8
Hampton School District K–8
High Bridge School District K–8
Holland Township School District K–8
Hunterdon Central Regional High School 9–12 Regional
Hunterdon County Vocational School District 9–12
Kingwood Township School District K–8
Lebanon Borough School District K–6
Lebanon Township Schools K–8
Milford Borough School District K–8
North Hunterdon-Voorhees Regional High School District 9–12 Regional
Readington Township Public Schools K–8
South Hunterdon Regional School District K–12 Regional, established in 2014–15 from the following former districts:
Lambertville City School District K–6
Stockton Borough School District K–6
West Amwell Township School District K–6
Tewksbury Township Schools K–8
Union Township School District K–8

Mercer County 
East Windsor Regional School District K–12 Regional
Ewing Public Schools K–12
Hamilton Township School District K–12
International Academy of Trenton School District K-5
Hopewell Valley Regional School District K–12 Regional
Lawrence Township Public Schools K–12
Mercer County Special Services School District Pre-K–12 County
Mercer County Technical Schools 9–12
Princeton Public Schools K–12 Regional
Robbinsville Public School District K–12
Trenton Public Schools K–12
West Windsor-Plainsboro Regional School District K–12 Regional (serving communities in both Mercer and Middlesex counties)

Middlesex County 
Carteret School District K–12
Cranbury School District K–8 
Dunellen Public Schools K–12
East Brunswick Public Schools K–12
Edison Township Public Schools K–12
Highland Park Public Schools K–12
Jamesburg Public Schools K–8
Metuchen School District K–12
Middlesex Board of Education K–12
Middlesex County Vocational and Technical Schools 9–12 Vocational
Milltown Public Schools K–8
Monroe Township School District K–12
New Brunswick Public Schools K–12
North Brunswick Township Public Schools K–12
Old Bridge Township Public Schools K–12
Perth Amboy Public Schools K–12
Piscataway Township Schools K–12
Sayreville Public Schools K–12
South Amboy Public Schools K–12
South Brunswick Public Schools K–12
South Plainfield Public Schools K–12
South River Public Schools K–12
Spotswood Public Schools K–12
Woodbridge Township School District K–12

Monmouth County 
Asbury Park Public Schools
Atlantic Highlands School District
Avon School District
Belmar School District
Bradley Beach School District
Brielle School District
Colts Neck School District
Deal School District
Eatontown Public Schools
Fair Haven Public Schools
Farmingdale School District
Freehold Borough Schools
Freehold Regional High School District – Regional
Freehold Township Schools
Hazlet Township Public Schools
Henry Hudson Regional High School – Regional
Highlands School District
Holmdel Township Public Schools
Howell Township Public Schools
Keansburg School District
Keyport Public Schools
Little Silver School District
Long Branch Public Schools
Manalapan-Englishtown Regional School District – Regional
Manasquan Public Schools
Marlboro Township Public School District
Matawan-Aberdeen Regional School District – Regional
Middletown Township Public School District
Millstone Township Schools
Monmouth Beach School District
Monmouth County Vocational School District
Monmouth Regional High School – Regional
Neptune City School District
Neptune Township Schools
Ocean Township School District (Monmouth County, New Jersey) – Consolidated
Oceanport School District
Red Bank Borough Public Schools
Red Bank Regional High School – Regional
Roosevelt Public School District
Rumson School District
Rumson-Fair Haven Regional High School – Regional
Sea Girt School District
Shore Regional High School – Regional
Shrewsbury Borough School District
Spring Lake School District
Spring Lake Heights School District
Tinton Falls School District – Regional
Union Beach School System
Upper Freehold Regional School District – Regional
Wall Township Public Schools
West Long Branch Public Schools

Morris County 
Boonton Public Schools K–12
Boonton Township School District K–8
Butler Public Schools K–12
School District of the Chathams – Regional K–12 
Chester School District – Consolidated K–8
Denville Township School District K–8
Dover School District K–12
East Hanover School District K–8
Florham Park School District K–8
Hanover Park Regional High School District – Regional 9–12
Hanover Township Public Schools K–8
Harding Township School District K–8
Jefferson Township Public Schools K–12
Kinnelon Public Schools
Lincoln Park Public Schools
Long Hill Township School System
Madison Public Schools
Mendham Borough Schools
Mendham Township Public Schools
Mine Hill School District
Montville Township School District K–12
Morris County Vocational School District
Morris Hills Regional High School District – Regional 9–12
Morris Plains Schools
Morris School District – Regional
Mount Arlington School District
Mount Olive Township School District
Mountain Lakes Schools K–12
Netcong School District
Parsippany-Troy Hills School District K–12
Pequannock Township School District
Randolph Township Schools
Riverdale School District
Rockaway Borough Public Schools K–8
Rockaway Township Public Schools K–8
Roxbury School District K–12
Washington Township Schools K–8
West Morris Regional High School District – Regional
Wharton Borough School District K–8

Ocean County 
Barnegat Township School District
Bay Head School District
Beach Haven School District
Berkeley Township School District
Brick Public Schools
Central Regional School District – Regional
Eagleswood Township School District
Island Heights School District
Jackson School District
Lacey Township School District
Lakehurst School District
Lakewood School District
Lavallette School District
Little Egg Harbor Township School District
Long Beach Island Consolidated School District – Consolidated
Manchester Township School District
Ocean County Vocational Technical School – Countywide
Ocean Gate School District
Ocean Township School District (Ocean County, New Jersey)
Pinelands Regional School District – Regional
Plumsted Township School District
Point Pleasant Beach School District
Point Pleasant School District
Seaside Heights School District
Seaside Park School District
Southern Regional School District – Regional
Stafford Township School District
Toms River Regional Schools – Regional
Tuckerton School District

Passaic County 
Bloomingdale School District K–8
Clifton Public Schools K–12
Haledon School District K–8
Hawthorne Public Schools K–12
Lakeland Regional High School 9–12 Regional
Little Falls Township Public Schools K–8
Manchester Regional High School 9–12 Regional
North Haledon School District K–8
Passaic City School District K–12
Passaic County Vocational School District 9–12 Vocational
Passaic Valley Regional High School 9–12 Regional
Paterson Public Schools K–12
Pompton Lakes School District K–12
Prospect Park School District K–8
Ringwood Public School District K–8
Totowa Borough Public Schools K–8
Wanaque Borough Schools K–8
Wayne Public Schools K–12
West Milford Township Public Schools K–12
Woodland Park School District K–8

Salem County 
Alloway Township School District
Elmer School District
Elsinboro Township School District
Lower Alloways Creek Township School District
Mannington Township School District
Oldmans Township School District
Penns Grove-Carneys Point Regional School District – Regional
Pennsville School District
Pittsgrove Township School District
Quinton Township School District
Salem City School District
Salem County Special Services School District
Salem County Vocational Technical Schools
Upper Pittsgrove School District
Woodstown-Pilesgrove Regional School District – Regional

Somerset County 
Bedminster Township School District K–8
Bernards Township School District K–12
Bound Brook School District K–12
Branchburg Township School District K–8
Bridgewater-Raritan Regional School District – K–12 Regional
Franklin Township Public Schools K–12
Green Brook School District K–8
Hillsborough Township School District K–12
Manville School District K–12
Montgomery Township School District K–12
North Plainfield School District K–12
Somerset County Vocational and Technical School District 9–12
Somerset Hills Regional School District K–12 Regional
Somerville Public Schools K–12
South Bound Brook School District K–8
Warren Township Schools K–8
Watchung Borough Schools K–8
Watchung Hills Regional High School 9–12 Regional

Sussex County 

Andover Regional School District – Regional (K–8)
Byram Township School District (K–8)
Frankford Township School District (K–8)
Franklin Borough School District (K–8)
Fredon Township School District (K–6)
Green Township School District (K–8)
Hamburg School District (K–8)
Hampton Township School District (K–6)
Hardyston Township School District (K–8)
High Point Regional High School – Regional (9–12)
Hopatcong Public Schools (K–12)
Kittatinny Regional High School – Regional (7–12)
Lafayette Township School District (K–8)
Lenape Valley Regional High School – Regional (9–12)
Montague Township School District (K–8)
Newton Public School District (K–12)
Ogdensburg Borough School District (K–8)
Sandyston-Walpack Consolidated School District – Consolidated (K–6)
Sparta Township Public School District (K–12)
Stanhope Public Schools (K–8)
Stillwater Township School District (K–6)
Sussex County Vocational School District (9–12)
Sussex-Wantage Regional School District – Regional (K–8)
Vernon Township School District (K–12)
Wallkill Valley Regional High School – Regional (9–12)

Union County 
Berkeley Heights Public Schools K–12
Clark Public School District K–12
Cranford Township Public Schools K–12
Elizabeth Public Schools K–12
Garwood Public Schools K–8
Hillside Public Schools K–12
Kenilworth Public Schools K–12
Linden Public Schools K–12
Mountainside School District K–8
New Providence School District K–12
Plainfield Public School District K–12
Rahway Public Schools K–12
Roselle Public Schools K–12
Roselle Park School District K–12
Scotch Plains-Fanwood Regional School District K–12 Regional
Springfield Public Schools K–12
Summit Public Schools K–12
Union County Vocational Technical Schools 9–12
Union Public School District K–12
Westfield Public Schools K–12
Winfield Township School District K–8

Warren County 
Allamuchy Township School District K–8
Alpha School District K–8
Belvidere School District K–12
Blairstown Township School District K–6
Franklin Township School District (Warren County, New Jersey) K–6
Frelinghuysen Township School District K–6
Great Meadows Regional School District K–8 Regional 
Greenwich Township School District K–8
Hackettstown School District K–12
Harmony Township School District K–8
Hope Township School District K–8
Knowlton Township School District K–6
Lopatcong Township School District K–8
Mansfield Township School District K–6
North Warren Regional High School 7–12 Regional
Oxford Township School District K–8
Phillipsburg School District K–12
Pohatcong Township School District K–8
Warren County Special Services School District K–12 Special Education
Warren County Vocational School District 9–12
Warren Hills Regional School District 7–12 Regional
Washington Borough Public Schools K–6
Washington Township School District K–6
White Township School District K–8

References

School districts
New Jersey
School districts